Richard Hutton (died 1604) was an English Member of Parliament.

He was an armourer by trade and an alderman of London. He was elected a Member (MP) of the Parliament of England for Southwark in 1584, 1586, 1589, 1595 and 1597.

References

16th-century births
1604 deaths

Year of birth unknown
English MPs 1584–1585
English MPs 1586–1587
English MPs 1589
English MPs 1593
English MPs 1597–1598